Koloss is the seventh studio album by Swedish extreme metal band Meshuggah, released on 23 March 2012 in Germany, on 26 March in the rest of Europe, and on March 27 in North America, by Nuclear Blast.

Background
Tomas Haake stated, "As always, we try to take our music in a slightly different direction with each album and with Koloss, we feel that we really nailed what we were going for. Organic brutality, viscera and groove all crammed into a 54-minute metalicious treat, best avoided by the faint of heart!!"

The Koloss album was different from others in terms of cooperation and making music together. Fredrik and Mårten worked together in creating a couple of songs together. Jens Kidman who retired from guitar playing since the album Contradictions Collapse composed "Behind the Sun".

Release
The album was released on 23 March 2012 in Germany, 26 March in the rest of Europe and on March 27 in North America. It was released as a standard compact disc, as a digipak version featuring a bonus DVD, as a limited edition boxed set "magic cube" (a mock-Rubik's Cube featuring the album artwork, available only through Nuclear Blast mail-order), and a double-LP pressed on brown vinyl.

The album debuted at number 17 in the United States, with first week sales of 18,342 copies, the band's and record label's highest position on the charts. Koloss also debuted at number 27 on the Canadian Albums Chart.

Reception

Koloss received generally favorable reviews. Kory Grow of Spin Magazine called it "the first real contender for the genre's album of the year".

Track listing

I Am Colossus EP
"I Am Colossus" was released as a two-track EP. The stop-motion video for the song was compared to similar videos created by the band Tool.

Personnel
 Jens Kidman – vocals
 Fredrik Thordendal – lead guitar
 Mårten Hagström – rhythm guitar
 Dick Lövgren – bass
 Tomas Haake – drums
 Luminokaya – artwork

Charts

References

Further reading

 Meshuggah Drummer Talks 'Koloss' in New Interview - Feb. 2, 2012. Blabbermouth.net
 Meshuggah Drummer Talks 'Koloss' in Second Part Of New Interview - Feb. 3, 2012. Blabbermouth.net

Meshuggah albums
Nuclear Blast albums
2012 albums